Mahlow station is a station in the town of Mahlow in the municipality of Blankenfelde-Mahlow in the district of Teltow-Fläming in the German state of Brandenburg. It is on the Berlin–Dresden suburban line and is served by Berlin S-Bahn line S2.

Location 

The station is located in the centre of the town of Mahlow at kilometre 16.8 of the Berlin–Dresden railway, a few hundred metres inside the Berlin Outer Ring (Berliner Außenring, BAR).

History

The Mahlow station was opened along with the Dresden Railway on 17 June 1875. Electric S-Bahn trains ran to Mahlow from 15 May 1939 and the S-Bahn connection was extended to Rangsdorf in October 1940. The station building was hit and badly damaged in air raids in 1943.
 
S-Bahn traffic from the north was cut off by the construction of the Berlin Wall in August 1961. A shuttle service was operated south to Rangsdorf, but it was closed in September 1961. Instead an existing service between Rangsdorf and Wünsdorf was extended to Mahlow, but it was diverted to run over the Outer Ring to Schönefeld in May 1963. In order to maintain a connection to Mahlow, a separate platform was built at Blankenfelde station and the short section was served by a shuttle service. This was operated during the first years by a train that included a diesel locomotive of class V 15 and a control car. The train was nicknamed the "Blauer Bock" (blue billy goat), because of the blue paint applied to the locomotive and the name of a contemporary radio entertainment program.

After the reunification of Germany, it was decided to reconnect the West Berlin S-Bahn network with the surrounding area. Since the Dresden Railway had been electrified with the overhead system in 1985, the restoration of the S-Bahn to Rangsdorf would have required a completely new section of track to be built. Therefore, the initial restoration of S-Bahn services has been limited to the route to Blankenfelde, where it is now necessary to change to regional services. The "Blauer Bock" was abandoned on 16 September 1991 and electrical services were restored on the rebuilt section. The S-Bahn service from Blankenfelde to Mahlow via Lichtenrade and on to Bernau resumed on 31 August 1992.

Infrastructure

The station building is located east of the tracks. It is essentially a new building, which was created in 1961 and opened shortly before the building of the Berlin Wall. The S-Bahn platform is in an elevated position and is an island platform with two tracks. Mahlow serves as a crossing station, where the trains on line S2 meet on the otherwise single-track line between Lichtenrade and Blankenfelde. The disused long-distance tracks run between the platform and station building and north of the station building there is a track for loading freight to and from road transport. The Royal Prussian Military Railway had its station building on the western side of the railway tracks. It is now used as a residence and is a heritage-listed building.

Connections 

The station is served by S-Bahn line S2 operated at 20-minute intervals and it is possible to change to buses operated by the Verkehrsgesellschaft Teltow-Fläming (the municipal bus company of Teltow-Fläming).

See also 

 List of railway stations in Berlin
 List of railway stations in Brandenburg

Notes

References

External links 

 

Mahlow
Railway stations in Brandenburg
Buildings and structures in Teltow-Fläming
Railway stations in Germany opened in 1875